Cassine koordersii is a species of plant in the family Celastraceae. It is endemic to Java in Indonesia. It is a critically endangered species threatened by habitat loss.

References

koordersii
Endemic flora of Java
Critically endangered plants
Taxonomy articles created by Polbot